Liguria (minor planet designation: 356 Liguria) is a very large main-belt asteroid that was discovered by Auguste Charlois on January 21, 1893, in Nice. It is one of seven of Charlois's discoveries that was expressly named by the Astromomisches Rechen-Institut (Astronomical Calculation Institute), and was named for the Italian region.

13-cm radar observations of this asteroid from the Arecibo Observatory between 1980 and 1985 were used to produce a diameter estimate of 155 km.

Since 1991, the asteroid has been observed in stellar occultation a total of 6 times, all but one were single chord occultations. A 2006 double chord observation indicated a diameter of 126.6 +/-8.3 km.

References

External links 
 
 

000356
Discoveries by Auguste Charlois
Named minor planets
000356
18930121